Indah (Malay for "beautiful") may refer to:

 Indah Water Konsortium, a national sewerage company in Malaysia
 Indah (orangutan), a resident of the Great Ape Trust

Places:

 Pulau Indah, an island in Klang, Selangor, Malaysia
 Kota Harapan Indah, a city in Bekasi, West Java, Indonesia
 Setia Indah, a township in Johor Bahru, Johor, Malaysia
 Bukit Indah, a township in Iskandar Puteri, Johor, Malaysia
 Pandan Indah, a township in Ampang, Selangor, Malaysia
 Pondok Indah, a residential area in South Jakarta, Indonesia

People:

 Dita Indah Sari (born 1972), an Indonesian trade union and socialist activist
 Indah Nevertari (born 1992), Indonesian singer